Heliamphora parva is a species of marsh pitcher plant known only from the Neblina Massif in Venezuela, where it grows at elevations of 1750–2200 m.

References

Further reading
  Brewer-Carías, C. (September 1972).  Natura 48/49: 4–7.
  Brewer-Carías, C. (May 1973).  Defensa de la Naturaleza 2(6): 17–26.
  Associazione Italiana Piante Carnivore.

parva
Flora of Venezuela
Plants described in 2011
Flora of the Tepuis